Hardwick is the primary village and a census-designated place (CDP) in the town of Hardwick, Caledonia County, Vermont, United States. As of the 2020 census, the CDP had a population of 1,269, out of 2,920 in the entire town of Hardwick.

Hardwick village is in western Caledonia County, in the southern part of the town of Hardwick. Vermont Routes 14 and 15 pass through the village, joining to follow Wolcott Street north from the village center. Route 15 leads southeast  to U.S. Route 2 in West Danville, and northwest  to Morrisville, while Route 14 leads north  to Irasburg and south  to East Montpelier.

The Lamoille River flows through the center of Hardwick. It continues northwest to flow into Lake Champlain north of Colchester.

References 

Populated places in Caledonia County, Vermont
Census-designated places in Caledonia County, Vermont
Census-designated places in Vermont